Brigita Krašovec (born 20 January 2004) is a Slovenian rhythmic gymnast. She is the 2020 Slovenian All-Around silver medalist and a two-time (2018, 2019) Slovenian Junior All-Around champion. She won a silver medal at the 2018 World Show Dance Championships in Prague, Czech Republic and a silver medal at the 2021 World Modern & Contemporary Championships in Warszawa, Poland.

Career

Junior
In 2018, she stepped in junior category and immediately started sweeping medals. In May, she competed at the International Tournament Guadalajara, where she qualified to two Apparatus finals. She won silver medal behind Lala Kramarenko in Ribbon final and placed 5th in Clubs final. She qualified to Junior European Championships in Guadalajara, Spain, where she and her teammate Ivona Vukićević placed 15th in Team competition together with Slovenian senior group. She had 8th best result in All-around (56.750) and placed 19th in Ball and Clubs qualifications, 28th in Ribbon and 31st in Hoop qualifications. Shortly after that, she became the 2018 Slovenian Junior  All-around champion and won gold medals in all Apparatus finals.

In 2019, she competed at International Tournament Sofia Cup , where she placed 4th in All-around and qualified to Rope, Ball and Clubs finals.  In May, she proved her dominance again and defended the title of junior national champion, winning all five gold medals. She represented Slovenia at the 2019 Junior World Championships in Moscow, Russia. She also competed at the 2019 Mediterranean Junior Championships in Cagliari, Italy, where she won bronze medal in Ribbon final and finished 6th in Team competition with Ivona Vukićević.

Senior
In 2021, she made her World Cup debut in March, in Sofia, Bulgaria, where she placed 51st in All-Around.

Competititve highlights

Routine music information

References

External links 
 

2004 births
Living people
Slovenian rhythmic gymnasts
Sportspeople from Ljubljana